When the Devil Dances is the third book in John Ringo's Legacy of the Aldenata series.  It follows the exploits of Michael O'Neal and other members of humanity as they defend Earth against an alien invasion by the Posleen.

References

Novels by John Ringo
Legacy of the Aldenata
2002 American novels